Chyle Hole or Kyle is a depression or hole where a stream disappears. It is located in the Town of Springfield north of Chyle Road by the Warren town line. It was known to the Indians as Theogsowone which translates to "wedge".

The bottoms and sides of Chyle Hole are limestone, partially covered with earth. There are 2 or 3 cracks in the bottom that the water flows into during heavy rain or snow melt.

References

Landforms of Otsego County, New York